The Mainland Affairs Council (MAC) is a cabinet-level administrative agency under the Executive Yuan of the Republic of China in Taiwan.

The MAC is responsible for the planning, development, and implementation of the cross-strait relations policy which targets mainland China, Hong Kong and Macau.

The MAC's counterpart body in the People's Republic of China is the Taiwan Affairs Office. Both states officially claim each other's territory, however the Republic of China controls only Taiwan and Penghu as well as surrounding islands, and therefore is usually known as "Taiwan", sometimes referred to as the "Free Area" of the Republic of China by the Constitution of the Republic of China. The People's Republic of China controls mainland China as well as Hong Kong, Macau, Hainan, and other islands and is therefore usually known simply as "China". Therefore, the affairs related to the PRC belongs to the MAC, not the Ministry of Foreign Affairs.

The Mainland Affairs Council is administered by a cabinet level Minister. The current Minister is Chiu Tai-san.

The council plays an important role in setting policy and development of cross-strait relations and advising the central government. The agency funds and indirectly administers the Straits Exchange Foundation which is the official intermediary with the PRC.

History
In November 1987, relations between the two sides of the Taiwan Strait have improved considerably after ROC government began to allow family-related visits to Mainland China. The Executive Yuan therefore established the Inter-Agency Mainland Affairs Committee in August 1988 as a taskforce to handle mainland-related affairs among the authorities. In April 1990, the ROC government drafted the Organization Act for the Mainland Affairs Council to strengthen Mainland China policy making and to enhance policy making efficiency. The third reading of the act was passed by the Legislative Yuan on 18 January 1991. On 28 January 1991, the act was promulgated by President Lee Teng-hui thus officially authorized the Mainland Affairs Council to be the agency for the overall planning and handling of affairs towards Mainland China. In 2017, some of the responsibilities of the Mongolian and Tibetan Affairs Commission (MTAC) were absorbed into the MAC's Department of Hong Kong and Macao Affairs, creating the expanded Department of Hong Kong, Macao, Inner Mongolia, and Tibet Affairs.

Organizational structure

The agency is organized in the following departments:

Internal departments
 Department of Policy Planning
 Department of Cultural and Educational Affairs
 Department of Economic Affairs
 Department of Legal Affairs
 Department of Hong Kong, Macao, Inner Mongolia, and Tibet Affairs
 Department of Information and Liaison

Offices
 Secretariat
 Personnel Office
 Accounting Office
 Civil Servant Ethics Office
 Information Management

Others
 Office of Hong Kong Affairs
 Office of Macao Affairs

List of MAC heads

See also 
 Political status of Taiwan
 National Unification Council
 Cross-Strait relations
 Taiwan Affairs Office
 Constitutional and Mainland Affairs Bureau
Committee for the Peaceful Reunification of the Fatherland — similar organization in North Korea
Ministry of Unification — similar organization in South Korea
Minister of Intra-German Relations — similar organization in West Germany
State Ministry for Reconciliation and Civic Equality of Georgia — similar organization in Georgia
Ministry of Temporarily Occupied Territories and IDPs — similar organization in Ukraine

References

External links 
 

1988 establishments in Taiwan
Cross-Strait relations
Executive Yuan
Government agencies established in 1988